Jack Grinnage (born Jack Eugene Stewart, January 20, 1931) is an American actor with a film and television career spanning seven decades. Born in Los Angeles, Grinnage made his first television appearances in 1954. The following year, he played Moose – one of three teenage rebels who chase James Dean – in Rebel Without a Cause (1955). Rebel Without a Cause was his first film where he received a screen credit.

Jack Grinnage continued to play supporting roles or bit parts in films like King Creole (1958) with Elvis Presley (in a crucial role as a mute gang member),  Spartacus (1960) and The Private Navy of Sgt. O'Farrell (1968). He also played an errant but sympathetic boy in the Twilight Zone episode The Mind and the Matter. In 1961, he appeared in the Broadway musical The Billy Barnes People. Between 1974 and 1975, he had a supporting role as News Service reporter Ron Updyke in the mystery series Kolchak: The Night Stalker. In 2009, Grinnage played the role of Marvell, the replacement janitor, in two episodes of Scrubs. His most recent credit is the television series The Kids Are Alright (2018).

Filmography

References

External links 
 
 
 

American male film actors
1931 births
Living people
Male actors from Los Angeles
American male television actors
20th-century American male actors
21st-century American male actors